"Mammy" is a nickname for a mother, used in several English dialects, most notably in Ireland and Wales. It may refer to:

 Mammy stereotype, a stock portrayal of a black woman who cared for or served people in a white family
 Mammy (1930 film), starring Al Jolson
 Mammy (1951 film), a French drama film
 Mammy (Gone with the Wind), a character in Gone with the Wind
 Mammy Two Shoes, a recurring character in MGM's Tom and Jerry cartoons

 Mammy yokum, a white hillbilly from the comic strip Li'l Abner
 "My Mammy", a U.S. popular song, a huge hit for Al Jolson

See also
 Maami, a 2011 film directed by Tunde Kelani
 Mama and papa
 Mami (disambiguation)
 Mamie (disambiguation)
 Mummy (disambiguation)
 Mommy (disambiguation)